South Asian cuisine encompasses a delectable variety of sub-cuisines and cooking styles that vary very widely, reflecting the diversity of the Indian subcontinent, even though there is a certain centrality to the general ingredients used. Terms used the recipes of varied Indian and other South Asian sub-cuisines sometimes tend to be multi-lingual and region-specific, mostly based on the author's specific sub-ethnicity, the popularity of a given vegetable/spice in a given sub-cuisine within South Asia, etc.

Indian cuisine is overwhelmingly vegetarian friendly and employs a variety of different fruits, vegetables, grains, and spices which vary in name from region to region within the country. Most Indian restaurants serve predominantly Punjabi/North Indian cuisine, while a limited few serve a very limited choice of some South Indian dishes like Dosa. But for the connoisseurs, India offers a complex and eclectic array of sub-cuisines to explore, which are equally vegetarian friendly and a delight to the taste buds.

Even for South Asian people, this wide variety of vegetables, fruits, grains and spices used in various Indian sub-cuisines can be mind-boggling because of the variety of region-specific names used for identifying the food items. Indian vegetable markets and grocery stores get their wholesale supplies from suppliers belonging to various regions/ethnicities from all over India and elsewhere, and the food suppliers/packagers mostly use sub-ethnic, region-specific item/ingredient names on the respective signs/labels used to identify specific vegetables, fruits, grains and spices based on their respective regions of origin. This further aggravates the confusion in identifying specific items/ingredients, especially for international consumers/expatriates looking to procure vegetables, fruits, grains and spices specific to Indian sub-cuisines.

This article attempts to centralize, compile and tabulate the various vegetables, fruits, grains and spices that are commonly employed in various South Asian sub-cuisines to help reduce this confusion in identifying and procuring various South Asian food ingredients, especially in the cross-regional, international markets/contexts.

The following is a list of common South Asian ingredients, as well as their names in various local languages spoken.

Pulses and dry legumes

Cereals

Spices

Cucumbers, gourds, and squashes

Leaf vegetables

Root vegetables

Other vegetables

Nuts

Legumes

Flour

Fruits

Other

See also

 South Asian cuisine
 List of foods

Plants
Plants
Plants
Lists of plants